Tmesisternus obsoletus is a species of beetle in the family Cerambycidae. It was described by Blanchard in 1855.

References

obsoletus
Beetles described in 1855